Transcorp Power Limited's Ughelli Power Plant is a gas-fired thermal plant located in Ughelli, Delta State in the Niger Delta region of Nigeria. It is the largest fossil-fuel based power generating station in the country. The plant has installed capacity of 972 MW; and is capable of generating 2500 GWh of electricity annually. The plant meets current world specifications for plants of its type, and includes an updated control room, a switchgear room, a staff training school and recreational facilities.

Most of the electricity produced by Ughelli is transported through a network of conductors, to the national grid. The refurbishment of existing power units and the addition of a new 400 MW project are likely to drive a 4x increase in revenue to NGN100 billion by 2020.

The plant is an asset of Transnational Corporation of Nigeria Plc (Transcorp)’s power subsidiary, Transcorp Ughelli Power Limited (Transcorp Power).

History 
The station was built in 1964 with an installed capacity of 2X36MW or 72MW from two Stal-Laval gas turbines and began operations in 1966. Then the station was called Delta I under the Electricity Corporation of Nigeria (ECN), a precursor to the Nigerian Electric Power Authority (NEPA) and its successor, the  Power Holding Company of Nigeria (PHCN).

In 1975, six units of General Electric (GE) Frame 5 gas turbines (20MW each) were installed in the station known as Delta II, after the merger of Niger Dam Authority (NDA), Kainji and the ECN to form the National Electric Power Authority (NEPA).

In 1978, an additional six units of GE Frame 5 gas turbines, like the ones installed in 1975, were added to Delta Power Station (Known as Delta III) to boost the installed capacity to a total of 312MW. In 1991, six 100MW (600MW) GE Frame 9 gas turbines were added. From 2000 to 2008 Delta II and Delta III GE units were upgraded to 150MW station each: built by Hitachi of Japan. The control systems were upgraded to Mark V, a fully computerized control system for Delta II and III. While Delta I was scrapped. Delta IV control system was also upgraded to Mark V by GE of USA which built the station.

On September 25, 2012, Transcorp Ughelli Power Limited (TUPL) (which comprises Wood Rock Energy Resources Limited, Symbion Power LLC, Thomassen Holding Limited, Medea Development S.A., Tenoil Petroleum and Energy Services Limited and PSL Engineering and Control Limited) won the $300m bid for the acquisition of the Ughelli Power Plant, one of the six power generation companies of the Power Holding Company of Nigeria (PHCN) being privatized by the Federal Government of Nigeria. Symbion Power divested in September 2015.

On November 1, 2013, Transcorp Power officially took physical ownership of Ughelli Power Plc, the owner and operator of Ughelli Power Plant following a handover ceremony hosted by the Federal Government of Nigeria.

Operator 

Transcorp Power Limited is the operator of Ughelli Power Plant.

Other Operators 

1. Amperion Power Company Ltd (Geregu)

2. Integrated Energy Company (Ibadan)

3. Vitro Power Ltd (Benin)

4. Aura Energy Ltd (Jos)

5. Integrated Energy Company (Yola)

6. Mainstream Energy Ltd (Kainji)

7. West Power & Gas (Eko Kann Consortium (Abuja)

8. 4Power Consortium (Port Harcourt)

9. Sahelian Power SPV Ltd

10. New Electricity Distribution Company/Korea Electric Power (Ikeja)

References

Power stations in Nigeria
Delta State